Benthem Crouwel Architects is a Dutch architectural firm founded in 1979 by Jan Benthem and Mels Crouwel. Today, partners Pascal Cornips, Daniel Jongtien, Saartje van der Made and Joost Vos lead an international team of 60 professionals at the Amsterdam based Benthem Crouwel LAB. They work on projects from Amsterdam, Paris and California.

The architecture practice covers every shape, scale and service of design. A diverse and international portfolio and over four decades of experience ensure they are fully equipped to tackle any urban challenge. This results in high quality sustainable urban environments and flexible, mixed-use buildings that are a pleasure to dwell in. Benthem Crouwel Architects designs beyond architecture - creating buildings, spaces and infrastructure that contribute to an urban ecosystem. The end result is a collection of seamlessly integrated functionalities - buildings that are meaningful, practical and beautiful.

History 
The founding partners Jan Benthem and Mels Crouwel met in 1979 at the Delft University of Technology, where one of the professors introduced them because he thought they would make a good team. They started their firm Benthem Crouwel Architects the same year, from a small basement in an Amsterdam canal house.

A key project in the early period was the home of Jan Benthem himself, De Fantasie in Almere (1982-1984). The house shows the pragmatic approach combined with the spatial and technical innovation that is typical for the office.  At that time they also got a series of assignments for customs emplacements on the border of The Netherlands with Belgium and Germany.

After several assignments at Amsterdam Schiphol Airport, such as a bicycle parking, Benthem Crouwel became the master architect Schiphol in 1986, in cooperation with NACO (Netherlands Airport Consultants). Since 1989 Benthem Crouwel is the supervisory architect of the international exhibition and conference centre of The Netherlands, Amsterdam RAI. 

Benthem Crouwel has designed museums, public buildings and transit. Some examples are the Anne Frank House (1999)and Ziggo Dome (2012) in Amsterdam, De Pont museum for contemporary art, Tilburg (1993), restoration and expansion of Las Palmas, Rotterdam (2008), Stedelijk Museum Amsterdam (2012), Datacenter AM4 (2017) and two office buildings for the Dutch Charity Lotteries (2018) and ING (2020).

The office is also involved in infrastructural projects. One of the newest projects are the North/South Line (Amsterdam Metro) and the renewal of all major Dutch transportation hubs; Amsterdam Central station, Utrecht Central station, Rotterdam Central station and The Hague Central station. And bridges, such as Muiderbrug, A1 Amsterdam – Rijnkanaal (2010) and the High Speed Train longest bridge at Hollandsch Diep (2006).

Mels Crouwel was Chief Government Architect from 2004 till 2008.

In 2021, the company won the contract for the design of the new Brno railway station, the Czech Republic.

Selection of completed projects 
 1984 House Benthem, Almere, NL
 1993 Museum De Pont, Tilburg, NL
 1993 Terminal West, Amsterdam Airport Schiphol, NL
 1995 Schiphol Plaza, Amsterdam Airport Schiphol, NL
 1995 Station Schiphol, Amsterdam Airport Schiphol, NL
 1996 Malietower, Den Haag, NL
 1998 Station building, Lelystad Airport, NL
 1998 Pop venue 013, Tilburg, NL
 1999 Anne Frank House, Amsterdam, NL
 2001 Villa ArenA, Amsterdam, NL
 2002 Photo museum FOAM, Amsterdam, NL
 2002 GEM, Museum of Contemporary Art, Den Haag, NL
 2004 Gerrit Rietveld Academie, Amsterdam, NL
 2006 Bridge High Speed Train, Hollandsch Diep, NL
 2008 Penthouse Las Palmas, Rotterdam, NL
 2009 Etrium, Köln, D
 2009 Elicium, Amsterdam RAI, NL
 2009 Deutsches Bergbau-Museum, Bochum, D
 2009 Muiderbridge, Amsterdam-Rijnkanaal, NL
 2009 Metropool, Hengelo, NL
 2010 ACTA, Academisch Centrum voor Tandheelkunde Amsterdam, NL
2011 Amsterdam Museum, Amsterdam, NL
 2012 Ziggo Dome, Amsterdam, NL
 2012 Stedelijk Museum, Amsterdam, Netherlands
 2015 Expansion Museum De Pont, NL
2013 Fletcher hotel, Amsterdam, NL
2014 Grotius building, Radboud University Nijmegen, NL
2014 Rotterdam Central Station, NL
2015 The Hague Central Station, NL
2015 Paleisbrug, Den Bosch, NL
2016 Utrecht Central Station, NL
2017 AM4 Datacenter, Amsterdam, NL
2017 Railway district Delft, NL
2018 North/South metro line, Amsterdam, NL
2018 Dutch Charity Lotteries Office, Amsterdam, NL
2018 Amsterdam Central Station, NL
2019 Expension Rai hal 5, NL
2020 ING Office, Amsterdam, NL

Selection of current projects 
 LAB42 building for University of Amsterdam
 Museum Arnhem, NL
 Residence Nádraží Žižkov, Prague, CZ 
 Schiphol Airport, Amsterdam, NL
 Datacenter AM7 and 9, Amsterdam NL
Residential building Pulse, Amsterdam, NL 
Metro Ligne 17 and 18, Paris, FR
Station Delft Campus, NL
Diridon station, USA
Afsluitdijk, NL

Selection of awards 
 1989 Berliner Kunstpreis in the category architecture
 1996 Wibautprijs from the City of Amsterdam for the urban development at Schiphol
 1999 BNA Kubus for the contribution to the infrastructural architecture in The Netherlands 
 2009 Deutsche Gütesiegel in gold for sustainable building for office building; the Etrium 
 2012 AIT Award in the category Health + Care, interior for ACTA, Academic Centre for Dentistry Amsterdam
 2012 Hedy d'Ancona Prijs for ACTA, Academic Centre for Dentistry Amsterdam
2015 BNA Best building of the year in the Netherlands and Dutch Building Award for high quality innovation, Rotterdam Central Station
2017 The American Architecture Prize design and transportation for Rotterdam Central Station
2018 World Architecture Prize for best building in Amsterdam and ARC18 Architecture Award for the best design of the North/South metro line
2019 BNA Building of the year and Amsterdam Architecture Prize, both for the North/South metro line
2019 Nederlandse Bouwprijs Talent met Toekomst (talent with a future) for Saartje van der Made, remarkable achievement for the North/South metro line
2019 BNA Building of the year and Amsterdam Architecture Prize, both for the North/South metro line

References

Further reading
 Benthem Crouwel: monografie. 010 Uitgeverij, 1992, .
 Hans van Dijk, Maarten Kloos: Benthem Crouwel: 1980-2000. 010 Uitgeverij, 1999, .
 Edwin Zwakman: Zwakman Benthem Crouwel. 010 Uitgeverij, 2009, .
 Kirsten Schipper, Christian Bunyan: Benthem Crouwel: 'BC AD' Benthem Crouwel 1979-2009, English Edition. 010 Uitgeverij, 2009, .
 Kirsten Schipper, Christian Bunyan: Benthem Crouwel: 'BC AD' Benthem Crouwel 1979-2009. 010 Uitgeverij, 2009, .

External links

 
 

Architecture firms of the Netherlands